Michel Douglas Guedes (born 16 January 1992), known as Michel Douglas, is a Brazilian footballer who plays for Grêmio Novorizontino as a forward.

Career
Born in Santa Luzia, Minas Gerais, Michel Douglas graduated from Portuguesa's youth system, and made his senior debut on 23 January, against Monte Azul. and made his top flight debut on 2 June, in a 2-2 draw against Náutico, as a starter; Michel also scored the tying goal.

Honours 
CSA
 Campeonato Brasileiro Série C: 2017

References

External links

Portuguesa profile 

1992 births
Living people
Brazilian footballers
Association football forwards
Campeonato Brasileiro Série A players
Campeonato Brasileiro Série B players
Campeonato Brasileiro Série C players
Campeonato Brasileiro Série D players
Associação Portuguesa de Desportos players
Clube Atlético Sorocaba players
Boa Esporte Clube players
Villa Nova Atlético Clube players
Tupi Football Club players
Brusque Futebol Clube players
Centro Sportivo Alagoano players
Vila Nova Futebol Clube players
Guarani FC players
Primeira Liga players
C.D. Aves players
Botafogo Futebol Clube (SP) players
Boavista Sport Club players
Grêmio Novorizontino players
Brazilian expatriate footballers
Expatriate footballers in Portugal
Brazilian expatriate sportspeople in Portugal